Trimeric intracellular cation-selective channel B (TRIC-B) is a monovalent cation channel in the ER membrane encoded by the transmembrane protein 38B (TMEM38B) gene. It is one of two known TRIC proteins, the other being TRIC-A.

Function
TRIC-B is permeable to both Na+ and K+ but not divalent cations like Ca2+. The channel exhibits marked voltage-dependence, becoming more open when the cytosol is more positively charged than the ER lumen. There at least four major sub-conductance states (with 80%, 60%, 46% and 30% of the conductance of the fully-opened channel). TMEM38B-knockout mice exhibit reduced IP3-receptor-mediated Ca2+ release. As such, K+ flux into the ER through TRIC-B is thought to support IP3-induced efflux of Ca2+ ions through IP3-gated Ca2+ channels in the ER membrane.

Clinical significance
Null mutations in TMEM38B reduce the levels of functional TRIC-B in heterozygotes and abolish expression of functional TRIC-B in homozygotes. Such mutations are an uncommon but relatively severe cause of autosomal recessive osteogenesis imperfecta or "brittle bone disease".

See also
TMEM38A
Trimeric intracellular cation-selective channel

References